Thunderhorse or Thunder horse may refer to:
 Thunder Horse PDQ, a semi-submersible oil rig in the Gulf of Mexico
 Thunder Horse Oil Field, a gas and oil field in the Gulf of Mexico
 "Thunderhorse", a song on the Dethklok album The Dethalbum
 Iron Thunderhorse, a Native American leader
 ThunderHorse, a Metal/Hard Rock band from San Jose, CA
  Thunder (mascot), the horse mascot for the Denver Broncos